The first dailies were established in Japan in 1870. In 2018 the number of the newspapers was 103 in the country.

Below is a list of newspapers published in Japan. (See also Japanese newspapers.)

Big five national newspapers in Japan includes: The Asahi Shimbun, Yomiuri Shimbun, Mainichi Shimbun, Nihon Keizai Shimbun, and Sankei Shimbun.

National papers

Big six 
 Yomiuri Shimbun (daily) 6,860,222
 The Asahi Shimbun (daily) 4,298,513
 Chunichi Shimbun / Tokyo Shimbun (daily) 2 ,321,414
 Mainichi Shimbun (daily) 1,933,714
 Nihon Keizai Shimbun (daily) 1,753,877
 Sankei Shimbun (daily) 1,026,293

Hokkaido

Block papers of Hokkaido 
 Hokkaido Shimbun

Regional papers of Hokkaido 
 Sorachi
 Kitasorachi Shimbun (Fukagawa)
 Press Sorachi (Takikawa)
 Shiribeshi
 Otaru Shimpō (Otaru)
 Iburi
 Muroran Mimpō (Muroran)
 Tomakomai Mimpō (Tomakomai)
 Hidaka
 Hidaka Hōchi Shimbun (Urakawa)
 Oshima
 Hakodate Shimbun (Hakodate)
 Kamikawa
 Asahikawa Shimbun (Asahikawa)
 Biei Shimbun (Biei)
 Dōhoku Nippō (Shibetsu)
 Hokuto Shimbun (Nayoro)
 Nayoro Shimbun (Nayoro)
 Nikkan Furano (Furano)
 Rumoi
 Nikkan Rumoi Shimbun (Rumoi)
 Sōya
 Nikkan Sōya (Wakkanai)
 Wakkanai Press (Wakkanai)
 Okhotsk
 Abashiri Times (Abashiri)
 Bihoro Shimbun (Bihoro)
 Hokkai Minyū Shimbun (Mombetsu)
 Keizai no Denshobato (Kitami)
 Kunneppu Shimpō (Kunneppu)
 Memambetsu Shimbun (Ōzora)
 Oketo Times (Oketo)
 Tsubetsu Shimpō (Tsubetsu)
 Yamanami (Engaru)
 Tokachi
 Tokachi Mainichi Shimbun (Obihiro)
 Kushiro
 Kushiro Shimbun (Kushiro)

Defunct newspapers of Hokkaido 
 Kitami Mainichi Shimbun (Kitami, 1950 – 1989)
 Akabira Shimpō (Akabira, 1962 – 1990)
 Nikkan Asahikawa Shimbun (Asahikawa, 1984 – 1992)
 Okhotsk Shimbun (Kitami, 1989 – 1993)
 Bibai Shimpō (Bibai, 1949 – 1996)
 Hokkai Times (prefecture paper, 1946 – 1998)
 Nahokkai Times (prefecture paper, 1946 – 1998)
 Kitami Gorjetsu (Kitami, 1912 – 2001)
 Abashiri Shimbun (Abashiri, 1947 – 2004)
 Mikasa Times (Mikasa, 1949 – 2007)
 Bibai Shimbun (Bibai, 1996 – 2007)
 Sorachi Times (Ashibetsu, 1950 – 2007)
 Shari Shimbun (Shari, 1979 – 2008)
 Ishikari Minyū Shimbun (Ishikari, 1988 – 2009)
 Sapporo Times (Sapporo, 1999 – 2009)
 Okhotsk Shimbun (former Mombetsu Shimbun, Mombetsu, 1958 – 2009)
 Nikkan Iwamizawa Shimbun (Iwamizawa, 1949 – 2009)
 Engaru Shimbun (Engaru, 1976 – 2015)
 Minamisorachi Shimpō (Kuriyama)
 Chitose Mimpō (Chitose)
 'Yūbari Times (Yūbari)
 Nemuro Shimbun (Nemuro)
 Haboro Times (Haboro)

 Tōhoku region 

 Block paper of Tōhoku region 
 Kahoku Shimpō Prefecture papers of Tōhoku region 
 Aomori
 Tōō Nippō Iwate
 Iwate Nippō Akita
 Akita Sakigake Shimpō Yamagata
 Yamagata Shimbun Fukushima
 Fukushima Minpō Regional papers of Tōhoku region 
 Aomori
 Daily Tōhoku (Hachinohe)
 Mutsu Shimpō (Hirosaki)
 Tsugaru Shimpō (Kuroishi)
 Iwate
 Iwate Nichinichi Shimbun (Ichinoseki)
 Morioka Times (Morioka)
 Tankō Nichinichi Shimbun (Ōshū)
 Tōkai Shimpō (Ōfunato)
 Miyagi
 Ishinomaki Hibi Shimbun (Ishinomaki)
 Ishinomaki Kahoku (Ishinomaki)
 Ōsaki Times (Ōsaki)
 Riasu no Kaze (Kesennuma)
 Sanriku Shimpō (Kesennuma)
 Akita
 Akita Mimpō (Daisen)
 Hokuroku Shimbun (Ōdate)
 Hokuu Shimpō (Noshiro)
 Senboku Shimbun (Daisen)
 Yamagata
 Shōnai Nippō (Tsuruoka)
 Fukushima
 Abukuma Jihō (Sukagawa)
 Fukushima Minyū (Fukushima)
 Iwaki Mimpō (Iwaki)
 Yūkan Yamatsuri (Yamatsuri)
 Ōtsuchi Shimbun (Ōtsuchi)

 Defunct newspapers of Tōhoku region 
 Miyagi Times (Kesennuma, – 1995)
 Ishinomaki Shimbun (Ishinomaki, 1946 – 1998)
 Kamaishi Shimpō (Kamaishi, 1982 – 1999)
 Jōyō Shimbun (Minamisanriku, – 2007)
 Senpoku Shimbun (Naruko, – 2007)
 Iwate Tōkai Shimbun (Kamaishi, 1948 – 2011)
 Minamisanriku Shimbun (Minamisanriku, 2008 – 2011)
 Fujisato Shimbun (Fujisato, 1959 – 2012)
 Ōdate Shimpō (Ōdate, 1980 – 2015)
 Fukkō Kamaishi Shimbun (Kamaishi, 2011 – 2021)
 Yonezawa Shimbun (Yonezawa, 1879 – 2021)

 Kantō region 
 Prefecture papers of Kantō region 
 Ibaraki
 Ibaraki Shimbun Tochigi
 Shimotsuke Shimbun Gunma
 Jōmō Shimbun Saitama
 Saitama Shimbun Chiba
 Chiba Nippō Kanagawa
 Kanagawa Shimbun Regional papers of Kantō region 
 Tochigi
 Mōka Shimbun (Mōka)
 Gunma
 Kiryū Times (Kiryū)
 Saitama
 Bunka Shimbun (Hannō)
 Chiba
 Bōnichi Shimbun (Tateyama)
 Kanagawa
 Shinsei Mimpō (Odawara)
 Tōkyō
 Nishitama Shimbun (Fussa)
 Ogasawara Shimbun (Ogasawara)
 Setagaya Shimbun (Setagaya)
 Suginami Shimbun (Suginami)
 Tama Tōkyō Nippō (Akishima)
 Toshima Shimbun (Toshima)
 Weekly News Nishi no Kaze (Oume)

 Defunct newspapers of Kantō region 
 Tōkyō Times (Kōtō, 1946 – 1992)
 Tochigi Shimbun (Utsunomiya, 1950 – 1996)
 Hitachi Mimpō (Hitachi, 1950 – 2000)
 Shin Ibaraki (Mito, 1952 – 2003)
 Nikkan Jōsō Shimbun (Chōshi, 1975 – 2009)
 Tama Newtown Times (Tama, 1969 – 2012)
 Bōsō Jiji Shimbun (Kisarazu, 1949 – 2012)
 Jōyō Shimbun (Tsuchiura, 1948 – 2013)
 Tokyo Nichi Nichi Shimbun (Tokyo, 1872 – 1943)
 Heimin Shinbun (Tokyo, 1903 – 1915)
 Nikkan Shimmimpō (Tokorozawa, 1952 – 2012)
 'Nankai Times (Hachijō)

Chūbu region

Prefecture papers of Chūbu region 
 Yamanashi
 Yamanashi Nichinichi Shimbun
 Nagano
 Shinano Mainichi Shimbun
 Niigata
 Niigata Nippō
 Toyama
 Kitanippon Shimbun
 Ishikawa
 Hokkoku Shimbun
 Fukui
 Fukui Shimbun
 Shizuoka
 Shizuoka Shimbun
 Gifu
 Gifu Shimbun

Regional papers of Chūbu region 
 Yamanashi
 Yamanashi Shimpō (Kōfu)
 Yatsugatake Journal (Hokuto)
 Nagano
 Minamishinshū Shimbun (Iida)
 Nagano Nippō (Suwa)
 Okaya Shimin Shimbun (Okaya)
 Ōito Times (Ōmachi)
 Shimin Times (Matsumoto)
 Suzaka Shimbum (Suzaka)
 Niigata
 Echigo Journal (Sanjō)
 Jōetsu Times (Jōetsu)
 Kashiwazaki Nippō (Kashiwazaki)
 Nagaoka Shimbun (Nagaoka)
 Ojiya Shimbun (Ojiya)
 Sanjō Shimbun (Sanjō)
 Shūhō Tōkamachi (Niigata)
 Tōkamachi Shimbun (Tōkamachi)
 Tōkamachi Times (Tōkamachi)
 Tsunan Shimbun (Tsunan)
 Toyama
 Jōhana Jihō (Nanto)
 Toyama Shimbun (Toyama)
 Ishikawa
 Hokuriku Chūnichi Shimbun (Kanazawa)
 Fukui
 Nikkan Kenmin Fukui (Fukui)
 Shizuoka
 Fuji News (Fuji)
 Gakuyō Shimbun (Fujinomiya)
 Izu Shimbun (Itō)
 Numazu Asahi Shimbun (Numazu)
 Numazu Shimbun (Numazu)
 Aichi
 Chūbu Keizai Shimbun (Nagoya)
 Higashiaichi Shimbun (Toyohashi)
 Mikawa Shimpō (Nishio)
 Nikkan Tōmei (Seto)
 Tōkai Aichi Shimbun (Okazaki)
 Tōkai Nichinichi Shimbun (Toyohashi)

Defunct newspapers of Chūbu region 
 Himi Shimbun (Himi, 1936 – 2000)
 Suwa Maiyū Shimbun (Suwa, 1954 – 2004)
 Chūbu Shimpō (Hekinan, 1959 – 2004)
 Kokoku Shimbun (Shimosuwa, 1946 – 2005)
 Hida News (Hida, 1995 – 2005)
 Ina Mainichi Shimbun (Ina, 1955 – 2008)
 Hakuba Shimbun (Hakuba, 1975 – 2008)
 Nagoya Times (Nagoya, 1946 – 2008)
 Kōshoku Shimbun (Chikuma, 1982 – 2011)
 Chūnō Shimbun (Seki, 1947 – 2011)
 Shinshū Nippō (Iida, 1956 - 2013)
 Kyōdo Shimbun (Kakegawa)

Kinki region

Prefecture papers of Kinki region 
 Kyōto
 Kyoto Shimbun
 Hyōgo
 Kobe Shimbun

Regional papers of Kinki region 
 Mie
 Ise Shimbun (Tsu)
 Kisei Shimbun (Owase)
 Nanki Shimpō (Kumano)
 Tōkai Keizai Shimbun (Tsu)
 Yoshino Kumano Shimbun (Kumano)
 Yūkan Mie (Matsusaka)
 Shiga
 Ōmi Dōmei Shimbun (Hikone)
 Shiga Hōchi Shimbun (HIgashiōmi)
 Kyōto
 Ayabe Shimin Shimbun (Ayabe)
 Kameoka Shimin Shimbun (Kameoka)
 Maizuru Shimin Shimbun (Maizuru)
 Rakunan Times (Uji)
 Ryōtan Nichinichi Shimbun (Fukuchiyama)
 Ōsaka
 Ōsaka Nichinichi Shimbun (Ōsaka)
 Jimmin Shimbun (Ibaraki)
 Nara
 Nara Shimbun (Nara)
 Wakayama
 Hidaka Shimpō (Gobō)
 Kii Mimpō (Wakayama)
 Kinan Shimbun (Shingū)
 Kishū Shimbun (Gobō)
 Kumano Shimbun (Shingū)
 Wakayama Shimpō (Wakayama)

Defunct newspapers of Kinki region 
 Shiga Nichinichi Shimbun (Ōtsu, 1922 – 1979)
 Kansai Shimbun (Ōsaka, – 1991)
 Ōsaka Shimbun (Ōsaka, 1946 – 2002)
 Doyōbi (Kyoto, 1936 – 1937)
 Nara Nichinichi Shimbun (Nara, 2006 - 2019)

Chūgoku region

Block paper of Chūgoku region 
 Chugoku Shimbun

Prefecture papers of Chūgoku region 
 Tottori
 Nihonkai Shimbun
 Shimane
 Sanin Chūō Shimpō
 Okayama
 Sanyō Shimbun
 Yamaguchi
 Yamaguchi Shimbun

Regional papers of Chūgoku region 
 Shimane
 Shimane Nichinichi Shimbun (Matsue)
 Okayama
 Bihoku Mimpō (Niimi)
 Tsuyama Asahi Shimbun (Tsuyama)
 Hiroshima
 Nishihiroshima Times (Hiroshima)
 Taiyō Shimbun (Fukuyama)
 Yamaguchi
 Bōnichi Shimbun (Hōfu)
 Hōfu Nippō (Hōfu)
 Nikkan Iwakuni (Iwakuni)
 Nikkan Shinshūnan (Shūnan)
 Saikyō Shimbun (Yamaguchi)
 Ube Nippō (Ube)
 Yanai Nichinichi Shimbun (Yanai)

Defunct newspapers of Chūgoku region 
 Bōchō Shimbun (Iwakuni, 1964 – 2006)
 Okayama Nichinichi Shimbun (Okayama, 1946 – 2011)

Shikoku

Prefecture papers of Shikoku 
 Kagawa
 Shikoku Shimbun
 Tokushima
 Tokushima Shimbun
 Ehime
 Ehime Shimbun
 Kōchi
 Kōchi Shimbun

Regional papers of Shikoku 
 Kagawa
 Shikoku Times (Takamatsu)
 Tokushima
 Tribune Shikoku (Tokushima)
 Ehime
 Yawatahama Mimpō (Yawatahama)

Defunct newspapers of Shikoku 
 Nikkan Shin Ehime (Matsuyama, 1960 – 1986)
 Yawatahama Shimbun (Yawatahama, 1928 – 2019)

Kyūshū, Okinawa

Block paper of Kyūshū 
 Nishinippon Shimbun

Prefecture papers of Kyūshū and Okinawa 
 Saga
 Saga Shimbun
 Nagasaki
 Nagasaki Shimbun
 Kumamoto
 Kumamoto Nichinichi Shimbun
 Ōita
 Ōita Gōdō Shimbun
 Miyazaki
 Miyazaki Nichinichi Shimbun
 Kagoshima
 Minaminippon Shimbun
 Okinawa
 Okinawa Times
 Ryūkyū Shimpō

Regional papers of Kyūshū and Okinawa 
 Fukuoka
 Ariake Shimpō (Ōmuta)
 Fukuoka Kenmin Shimbun (Fukuoka)
 Itoshima Shimbun (Itoshima)
 Kokura Times (Kitakyūshū)
 Saga
 Tosu Shimbun (Tosu)
 Nagasaki
 Iki Nichinichi Shimbun (Iki)
 Iki Nippō (Iki)
 Shimabara Shimbun (Shimabara)
 Tsushima Shimbun (Tsushima)
 Kumamoto
 Nikkan Hitoyoshi Shimbun (Hitoyoshi)
 Ōita
 Konnichi Shimbun (Beppu)
 Miyazaki
 Yūkan Daily (Nobeoka)
 Kagoshima
 Amami Shimbun (Naze)
 Minamikyūshū Shimbun (Kanoya)
 Nankai Nichinichi Shimbun (Naze)
 Okinawa
 Miyako Mainichi Shimbun (Miyakojima)
 Miyako Shimpō (Miyakojima)
 Yaeyama Mainichi Shimbun (Ishigaki)
 Yaeyama Nippō (Ishigaki)

Defunct newspapers of Kyūshū 
 Fukunichi Shimbun (Fukuoka, 1946 – 1992)
 Kagoshima Shimpō (Kagoshima, 1959 – 2004)
 Karatsu Shimbun (Karatsu, 1946 – 2008)
 Kurume Nichinichi Shimbun (Kurume, 1957 – 2017)
 Nikkan Ōmuta (Ōmuta, 1985 – 2018)

Sports papers 
 Chukyo Sports
 Chunichi Sports
 Daily Sports
 Doshin Sports
 Kyūshū Sports
 Nikkan Sports
 Nishinippon Sports
 Osaka Sports
 Sankei Sports
 Sports Hochi (formerly the Hochi Shimbun)
 Sports Nippon
 Tokyo Chunichi Sports
 Tokyo Sports

Party organs 
 Akahata (Red Flag) (newspaper of the Japanese Communist Party, daily) 
 Jiyu Minshu (newspaper of the Liberal Democratic Party (Japan), weekly)
 Komei Shimbun (newspaper of the Komeito, daily)
 Press Minshu (newspaper of the Democratic Party of Japan, sub-weekly)
 Shakai Shimpo (newspaper of the Social Democratic Party (Japan), weekly)

Business papers 
 Fuji Sankei Business i.
 The Kabushiki Shimbun
 Nihon Kogyo Simbun
 Nihon Securities Journal
 Nikkan Kogyo Shimbun
 Nikkei Kinyu Simbun (Nikkei Financial Daily)
 Nikkei Ryutsu Simbun (Nikkei Marketing Journal)
 Nikkei Sangyo Shimbun
 Nikkei Veritas

Industry papers 
 The Chemical Daily
 The Education Newspaper
 The Hoken Mainichi Shinbun
 Denki Shimbun (Electric Daily News)
 Japan Food Journal
 The Japan Marine Daily
 Japan Rubber Weekly
 The Minato Daily
 National Chamber of Agriculture
 Nikkan Jidosha Shimbun
 Nihon Nogyo Shinbun
 The Suisan Times

Tabloids 
 Nikkan Gendai
 Yukan Fuji

English language papers 
 The Asahi Shimbun Asia and Japan Watch
 The Japan News (formerly called The Daily Yomiuri)
 The Japan Times
 The Mainichi
 Nikkei Asian Review
 The Wall Street Journal Asia
 Tokyo Reporter, translates Japanese tabloids
 The Japan Times ST
 Asahi Weekly
 Japan Today

Chinese language papers 
 Chubun Doho
 Jiho Shyukan
 Toho Doho

Braille papers 
 Tenji Mainichi

Stance and circulation, only morning (2022) 

 Yomiuri: conservative (high quality paper) 6,860,000
 Asahi: left (high quality paper) 4,290,000
 Chunichi Shimbun/Tokyo Shimbun: left (high quality paper) 2,320,000
 Mainichi: liberal/left (high quality paper) 1,930,000
 Nihon Keizai: business, conservative (high quality paper) 1,750,000
 Nikkan Geadai: left (tabloid) 1,680,000 (Nominal)
 Tokyo Sports: (sports) 1,390,000 (Nominal)
 Chunichi Sports/Tokyo Chunichi Sports: 1390,000
 Nikkan Sports: 1,350,000
 Houchi Shimbun: (sports) 1,350,000
 Sankei Sports: 1,230,000
 Yukan Fuji: right (tabloid) 1,050,000
 Sankei: right (high quality paper) 1,02 0,000
 Akahata (Red Flag): Communist Party bulletin 1,000,000
 Hokkaido Shimbun: left (high quality paper) 84,0000
 Daily Sports: 640,000
 Shizuoka Shimbun: left (high quality paper) 537,000
 Chugoku Shimbun: left (high quality paper) 510,000
 Nishinippon Shimbun: left (high quality paper) 427,000
 Shinano Mainichi Shimbun: liberal (high quality paper) 412 ,000
 Kobe Shimbun: left (high quality paper) 408,100

References

Further reading
 
 
 

Japan
Newspapers